Gadessa is a genus of moths of the family Crambidae.

Species
Gadessa albifrons Moore, 1886
Gadessa nilusalis (Walker, 1859)
Gadessa ossea Butler, 1889

References

Spilomelinae
Crambidae genera
Taxa named by Frederic Moore